Monjebup Reserve is a 20.63 km2 nature reserve in south-west Western Australia.  It is 140 km north-east of Albany, 340 km west of Esperance and 430 km south-east of Perth.  It is owned and managed by Bush Heritage Australia (BHA), by which 9.56 km2 of it was purchased in 2005, with another 11.07 km2 in 2010, and forms part of BHA's Gondwana Link project.

Landscape and vegetation
The landscape is diverse, including upland duplex soils, breakaway complexes, sandplains, rocky slopes, hilltops and creeks.  Its vegetation communities include mallee, heath, Eucalyptus  and Casuarina woodlands, Melaleuca along creeks, Acacia acuminata woodland and Dryandra heath.

Fauna
Animals either recorded, or expected to be present, on the reserve include malleefowl, western whipbird, Carnaby's cockatoo, western mouse, black-gloved wallaby and tammar wallaby. The habitat could support chuditch, red-tailed phascogale, honey possum, western pygmy possum and common brushtail possum.

References

External links
 Bush Heritage Australia

Bush Heritage Australia reserves
Nature reserves in Western Australia
2005 establishments in Australia